El Diablo de vacaciones is a 1957 Argentine film.

External links
 

1957 films
1950s Spanish-language films
Argentine black-and-white films
1950s Argentine films